Ventas is an administrative neighborhood (barrio) of Madrid belonging to the district of Ciudad Lineal.

As of 1 March 2020, it has a population of 49,198.

The Almudena Cemetery, the biggest in Madrid and considered one of the largest in Western Europe, is located in the neighborhood.

References 

Wards of Madrid
Ciudad Lineal